Anta Province is one of thirteen provinces in the Cusco Region in the southern highlands of Peru.

Geography 
The Willkapampa mountain range traverses the province. Other mountains are listed below:

Political division
The province is divided into nine districts (singular: distrito), each of which is headed by a mayor (alcalde). The districts, with their capitals in parenthesis, are:

 Ancahuasi (Ancahuasi)
 Anta (Anta)
 Cachimayo (Cachimayo)
 Chinchaypujio (Chinchaypujio)
 Huarocondo (Huarocondo)
 Limatambo (Limatambo)
 Mollepata (Mollepata)
 Pucyura (Pucyura)
 Zurite (Zurite)

Ethnic groups 
The people in the province are mainly indigenous citizens of Quechua descent. Quechua is the language which the majority of the population (70.28%) learnt to speak in childhood, 29.35% of the residents started speaking in Spanish.

See also 
 Chukchu
 Kachimayu
 Killarumiyuq
 Quriwayrachina
 Tampukancha
 Tarawasi
 Wat'a

Sources 

Provinces of the Cusco Region